ACD is a Competitive Local Exchange Carrier and Internet Service Provider, headquartered in Lansing, Michigan.
ACD provides Fiber Optic Service, Metro Ethernet, Telephone, Hosted Phone Service, DSL, Datacenter and Web hosting services to all types of customers.

History 

ACD was founded as ACD Computers in 1986 by Kevin Schoen. ACD built and sold their own computer systems through the 1990s. In 1994 ACD became an Internet Service Provider, selling dial-up, hosting and other Internet Services. ACD Telecom, Inc., which is part of ACD obtained CLEC license in early 2000. ACD then deployed equipment into 7 Central Offices in the Lansing and Jackson Michigan markets, and started providing facilities based DSL, T1, Fiber and Phone Services. The company has since expanded to most of Lower Michigan.

Distributed Antenna System and Fiber Optic Network 

ACD owns a Midwest fiber optic and distributed antenna system (DAS). This system serves businesses and residential customers. This network offers gigabit Ethernet service to businesses. Fiber optic service is 50 to 100 times faster than cable modem service and DSL. 

The next generation of broadband consists of fiber optic cable deployed to business and residential customers.

Wifi Deployment 

ACD was provided with a US$750,000 grant by the Housing and Urban Development under a test project to deploy Wifi Service covering a  area in Springfield, Michigan. As part of the agreement, ACD was required to provide subsidized internet access for a period of 3 years after the deployment, which was completed in spring of 2009.

Datacenter 

The company has a  datacenter in North Lansing that also serves as its headquarters, and was constructed in 2006.

Security Systems 
ACD provides security systems to municipalities over its broadband network.

Fiber Networks and Broadband Stimulus Projects 

ACD provides services including gigabit Ethernet and SONET services. It has a construction arm that builds fiber networks.

ACD was awarded two rounds of federal funding for construction of fiber networks in more rural counties in Michigan.

Speed Up Midwest 

This project was created to increase broadband speeds. Local tech firms working with local and state governments can create Midwest Gigabit Cities. Over 1,100 communities applied for the Google Fiber network (creating gigabit cities). It was first turned on in Kansas City in 2012, and expanded to Provo Utah in January 2014.

News coverage 

Datacenter Map http://www.datacentermap.com/company/acd-net.html
GE Mapsite https://web.archive.org/web/20150220205301/http://www.gemapsight.com/blog/acd-net-obtains-joint-use-permits-faster-while-reducing-pole-inspection-costs/
Vimeo videos https://vimeo.com/tag:acd.net
Lansing Fiber Networks https://web.archive.org/web/20150317173220/http://www.lansingcitypulse.com/lansing/article-10968-the-speed-of-light.html
Hillsdale Fiber Optic Cables http://www.hillsdalecollegian.com/2014/11/fiber-optic-cables-are-kind-of-retro-if-hillsdale-gets-more-bandwidth-it-may-attract-more-entrepreneurs/
Hillsdale a deployment city for Gigabit Broadband http://www.hillsdale.net/article/20141016/News/141019315
Hillsdale proceeds with plan to build new fiber network http://www.hillsdale.net/article/20140714/News/140719625
Lansing-Based ACD Launches New Wireless Network in Springfield http://www.capitalgainsmedia.com/innovationnews/acd0316.aspx
ACD Expands Territory Beyond Lansing to Founders’ Hometown of Howell http://www.capitalgainsmedia.com/innovationnews/ACD0332.aspx
Zhone: Line-driven “N” MuniFi http://www.dailywireless.org/2008/06/10/7840/
Springfield, Michigan launches municipal Wi-Fi service http://www.muniwireless.com/2008/08/01/springfield-michigan-launches-municipal-wi-fi-service/
Downtown Lansing Gets New Technology Employer https://web.archive.org/web/20110714103022/http://www.mitechnews.com/articles.asp?id=5591
Downtown prepares for Wi-Fi service http://www.battlecreekenquirer.com/apps/pbcs.dll/article?AID=201011100313
Newly installed fiber optics service in Franklin bringing faster speeds http://www.theoaklandpress.com/general-news/20140723/newly-installed-fiber-optics-service-in-franklin-bringing-faster-speeds
Village of Franklin becomes a ‘Fiber Hood’ http://www.theoaklandpress.com/business/20140721/village-of-franklin-becomes-a-fiber-hood
HBPU proceeds with fiber optic plans http://www.hillsdale.net/article/20140714/News/140719625
ACD builds fiber network, improves local Internet coverage https://web.archive.org/web/20141016074032/http://m.ourmidland.com/mobile/news/acd-net-builds-fiber-network-improves-local-internet-coverage/article_d9d4a9d9-0019-53ec-8cb8-0002d9a267df.html
Fiber optic network project underway in Boyne http://www.boynegazette.com/2014/fiber-optic-network-project-underway-in-boyne/uncategorized/68962
Planning Commission approves four, 40-foot cell towers in city https://web.archive.org/web/20160119123610/http://www.twinsburgbulletin.com/news%20local/2014/10/16/planning-commission-approves-four-40-foot-cell-towers-in-city
ACD Obtains Joint Use Permits Faster While Reducing Pole Inspection Costs https://web.archive.org/web/20150220205301/http://www.gemapsight.com/blog/acd-net-obtains-joint-use-permits-faster-while-reducing-pole-inspection-costs/
ACD Thrives in New Location https://web.archive.org/web/20150220204752/http://lansingbusinessnews.com/articles/103-2007-april/497-acdnet-thrives-in-new-location.html
ACD continues long history of consistent growth http://www.capitalgainsmedia.com/innovationnews/ACD0644.aspx
Fiber optic company expands into Port Huron http://www.thetimesherald.com/story/news/local/2015/04/08/fiber-optic-company-expands-port-huron/25491611/

References

External links 

Companies based in Lansing, Michigan
American companies established in 1986
Telecommunications companies established in 1986
Telecommunications companies of the United States
1986 establishments in Michigan